Christopher Bobby "Chris" Mpofu (born 27 November 1985) is a Zimbabwean international cricketer. He has represented Zimbabwe at Test, ODI and Twenty20 International level.

Early life and career
Mpofu spent time in Brisbane, Australia at the National Performance Centre. He was coached by former Australian fast bowler, Damien Fleming.

Mpofu made his first-class debut for Matabeleland against Manicaland in March 2004, taking three wickets on debut. In the 2004/05 Faithwear Inter-Clothing Provincial One-Day Competition, Mpofu was the leading wicket-taker with 11 wickets. He repeated the good performance again in the 2005/06 edition with 9 wickets.

International career
Following the mass exodus of top level players in the Zimbabwean cricket crisis of 2004, Mpofu made his One-Day International debut against England, and cost the English team some anxious moments.

Following the exodus of the rebels, Mpofu was given his Test debut against Bangladesh at the M. A. Aziz Stadium, Chittagong. He had scores of 0 and 5 in the match. The match was an indication of Zimbabwe's horrific decline in Tests as Bangladesh secured their maiden Test victory, and that too by a major 226 runs.

One definite shortcoming, is his crease occupation. Not content with being stumped twice in an afternoon (for a pair) in the first Test against New Zealand in August 2005, he followed up by being run out for 3 in the second match, as he strolled down the pitch to congratulate his teammate Blessing Mahwire on reaching his half-century, with the ball still in action. He still tends to blow hot and cold and has few rivals in the race to be considered international cricket's worst batsman.

Despite containing the basics, a good away movement, and a good action, Mpofu struggled, as for a long time he was the lone seamer among a cluster of spinners, and he had no one to help him out, and consistency was a major problem for the young seamer. There was a game against Pakistan in which he took 1/75.

International comeback
As Mpofu later recalled, Zimbabwe's short tour of South Africa in 2010 was the most toughest part of his life. On flat batting pitches without any assistance to seamers, Mpofu recorded unflattering bowling figures of 1 for 59 in the Twenty20 match in Kimberley, and 0/59 in a One-Day International at Bloemfontein. Mpofu later said that he thought about Mick Lewis in that 438-game and how he never played for Australia again, and whether the same fate would befall Mpofu too.

It was former Zimbabwean fast-bowling great Heath Streak who helped Mpofu believe he could. When Streak was appointed as bowling coach, Mpofu had a sense that things were changing. The two had a more good understanding because Streak who also came from Matabeleland as Mpofu spoke in his mother language, Ndebele. Streak told Mpofu that in cricket, he needed a wider repoirtoire of balls. Furthermore, former English Test cricketer Robin Jackman told him after his disastrous performances in South Africa that if he had to succeed in international cricket, he will have to bowl a slower ball. Mpofu first tried that experiment in the nets, and following success there, tried them in an international match situation. This chain of incidents proved to be a turning point in Mpofu's career.

A string of decent performances followed in the 2010 tri-series against India and Sri Lanka, as Zimbabwe beat India (twice) and Sri Lanka (once) to reach the final ahead of favorites India, ultimately finishing as runners-up. Mpofu continued in the same vein in the team's tour of Ireland. Mpofu took 8 wickets from these two combined series.

2011 Cricket World Cup
Mpofu had a fine World Cup 2011 performance, with 7 wickets at an average of 22.71 from 4 matches and eased into a more senior role for Zimbabwe. Furthermore, he found a new-ball partner with Ray Price and created a new celebration jig with him as any one of them got a wicket.

Mid career (2010-2015)
Mpofu played in Zimbabwe's comeback Test match against Bangladesh, and took 5 wickets as Zimbabwe recorded their first victory since 2004 by a major 130 runs.

Chris Mpofu continued his good wicket-taking form in the next Test against Pakistan, by taking 2 wickets in the only innings he bowled. Another highlight being his six in the Zimbabwean first innings off Pakistan's stalwart spinner Saeed Ajmal that brought up the Zimbabwean 400. Despite this, the match was a heavy 7-wicket loss for the hosts who were playing at Bulawayo.

Mpofu continued his fine form in the next Test against New Zealand where he took 4 wickets in a single innings to restrict New Zealand to 426. He eventually finished with another 5-wicket haul. Despite captain Brendan Taylor's brilliant innings of 117 in the last innings, Zimbabwe lost the match narrowly by 34 runs, owing much to Black Caps debutant Doug Bracewell's 5-wicket haul that overshadowed Mpofu's and Kyle Jarvis's.

Chris Mpofu was left out of the Zimbabwe squad for the 2015 ICC Cricket World Cup in Australia. Although disappointed, he used this as motivation to improve on his cricket.

Records
He is the world record holder for conceding the fewest runs (6 runs) without bowling a maiden over in a T20 International after bowling the complete quota of overs.

References

External links
 
 
 Christopher Mpofu 2011 ICC Cricket World Cup Profile

1985 births
Living people
Mashonaland cricketers
Matabeleland cricketers
Matabeleland Tuskers cricketers
Westerns (Zimbabwe) cricketers
Zimbabwean cricketers
Zimbabwe One Day International cricketers
Zimbabwe Test cricketers
Zimbabwe Twenty20 International cricketers
Cricketers at the 2007 Cricket World Cup
Cricketers at the 2011 Cricket World Cup
Zimbabwe Select XI cricketers